Phil E. Riesen was a Democratic member of the Utah State House of Representatives, representing the state's 36th house district from 2006 to 2010. At the end of his second term, he chose not to run for reelection.

Riesen studied at the University of Oklahoma.

Riesen was for many years a versatile broadcaster, at stations including KIFI in Idaho Falls, Idaho and KALL and KSL in Salt Lake City, Utah. His son Rob is a well-established northern Utah broadcaster.

Riesen returned to broadcasting as a newsman on Salt Lake City-Ogden station KLO in 2012.

See also
 List of Utah State Legislatures

External links
Utah House of Representatives - Phil Riesen 'official UT House profile
Project Vote Smart - Phil E. Riesen profileFollow the Money'' - Phil Riesen
2006 campaign contributions

1943 births
Living people
Democratic Party members of the Utah House of Representatives
University of Oklahoma alumni
21st-century American politicians